Ismet Ramadan (born 18 Март 1998) is a Bulgarian footballer who lately played as a striker for TSV Rothwesten.

Career

Botev Plovdiv
Ramadan bеgan his youth career in Benkovski Byala and Chavdar Etropole before moving to Botev Plovdiv. On 14 May 2016 he made his debut for the team in A Group in a match against Cherno More Varna. Ramadan left the club in July 2017.

Career statistics

Club

References

External links
 

Living people
1998 births
Sportspeople from Pazardzhik
Bulgarian footballers
Bulgaria youth international footballers
Association football forwards
Botev Plovdiv players
FC Levski Karlovo players
First Professional Football League (Bulgaria) players
Second Professional Football League (Bulgaria) players
Bulgarian people of Turkish descent